Ha Yeung is a village in Sai Kung District, New Territories, Hong Kong.

Administration
Ha Yeung, including Mau Po and Siu Hang Hau, is a recognized village under the New Territories Small House Policy.

See also
 Sheung Sze Wan

References

External links

 Delineation of area of existing village Ha Yeung (Hang Hau) for election of resident representative (2019 to 2022)

Villages in Sai Kung District, Hong Kong
Clear Water Bay Peninsula